Thailand participated in the 2010 Summer Youth Olympics in Singapore.

Medalists

Archery

Boys

Mixed Team

Athletics

Boys
Track and Road Events

Field Events

Girls
Track and Road Events

Field Events

Badminton

Boys

Girls

Basketball

Girls

Cycling

Cross Country

Time Trial

BMX

Road Race

Overall

 * Received -5 for finishing road race with all three racers

Gymnastics

Artistic Gymnastics

Boys

Girls

Rowing

Sailing

One Person Dinghy

Windsurfing

Shooting

Pistol

Swimming

 * Qualified due to the withdrawal of another swimmer.

Table tennis

Individual

Team

Taekwondo

Tennis

Singles

Doubles

Triathlon

Girls

Mixed

Weightlifting

References

External links

Competitors List: Thailand

2010 in Thai sport
Nations at the 2010 Summer Youth Olympics
Thailand at the Youth Olympics